Minervino González (born 31 December 1913, date of death unknown) was a Spanish sports shooter. He competed in the 25 metre pistol and 50 metre pistol events at the 1960 Summer Olympics.

References

1913 births
Year of death missing
Spanish male sport shooters
Olympic shooters of Spain
Shooters at the 1960 Summer Olympics
Sportspeople from Zaragoza